Teucrium eremaeum is a species of flowering plant in the family Lamiaceae and is endemic to the south-west of Western Australia. It is a perennial herb or shrub with small, linear to lance-shaped leaves and white or cream-coloured flowers.

Description
Flowering occurs from September to November.

Taxonomy
Teucrium eremaeum was formally described in 1904 by Ludwig Diels in Botanische Jahrbücher für Systematik, Pflanzengeschichte und Pflanzengeographie. The specific epithet (eremaeum) means "lonely or solitary", referring to the habitat of this species.

Distribution and habitat
This germander grows on the edges of salt lakes and in disturbed areas in the Coolgardie and Mallee biogeographic regions in the south-west of Western Australia.

Conservation status
Teucrium eremaeum is classified as "not threatened" by the Western Australian Government Department of Parks and Wildlife.

References

eremaeum
Lamiales of Australia
Plants described in 1905
Taxa named by Ludwig Diels
Eudicots of Western Australia